Twelve daily newspapers and eleven Sunday-only weekly newspapers are distributed nationally in the United Kingdom. Others circulate in Scotland only and still, others serve smaller areas. National daily newspapers publish every day except Sundays and 25 December. Sunday newspapers may be independent; e.g. The Observer was an independent Sunday newspaper from its founding in 1791 until it was acquired by The Guardian in 1993. Many daily newspapers now have Sunday editions, usually with a related name (e.g. The Times and The Sunday Times), but are editorially distinct.

UK newspapers can generally be split into two distinct categories: the more serious and intellectual newspapers, usually referred to as the broadsheets, and sometimes known collectively as 'the quality press', and others, generally known as tabloids, and collectively as 'the popular press', which have tended to focus more on celebrity coverage and human interest stories rather than political reporting or overseas news. The tabloids in turn have been divided into the more sensationalist mass market titles, or 'red tops', such as The Sun and the Daily Mirror, and the middle-market papers, the Daily Express and the Daily Mail.

Most of the broadsheets, so called because of their historically larger size, have changed in recent years to a compact format, the same size as the tabloids. The Independent and The Times were the first to do so. The Guardian moved in September 2005 to what is described as a 'Berliner' format, slightly larger than a compact. Its Sunday stablemate The Observer followed suit. Both The Guardian and The Observer now use the tabloid format, having done so since January 2018. Despite these format changes, these newspapers are all still considered 'broadsheets'.

Other Sunday broadsheets, including The Sunday Times, which tend to have a large amount of supplementary sections, have kept their larger-sized format. The national Sunday titles usually have a different layout and style from their weekly sister papers, and are produced by separate journalistic and editorial staff. All the major UK newspapers currently have websites, some of which provide free access. The Times and The Sunday Times have a paywall requiring payment on a per-day or per-month basis by non-subscribers. The Financial Times business daily also has limited access for non-subscribers. The Independent became available online only upon its last printed edition on 26 March 2016. However unlike the previously mentioned newspapers, it does not require any payment to access its news content. Instead the newspaper offers extras for those wishing to sign up to a payment subscription, such as crosswords, Sudoku puzzles, weekend supplements and the ability to automatically download each daily edition to read offline. The London Economic is another example of a British digital/online only newspaper, however, unlike The Independent it has never run a print publication.

Most towns and cities in the UK have at least one local newspaper, such as the Evening Post in Bristol and The Echo in Cardiff. Local newspapers were listed in advertising guides such as the Mitchell's Press Directories.

They are not known nationally for their journalism in the way that (despite much syndication) some city-based newspapers in the USA are (e.g. The New York Times, The Washington Post, The Boston Globe, Los Angeles Times). An exception to this was the Manchester Guardian, which dropped the 'Manchester' from its name in 1959 and relocated its main operations to London in 1964. The Guardian Media Group produced a Mancunian paper, the Manchester Evening News, until 2010 when along with its other local newspapers in the Greater Manchester area it was sold to Trinity Mirror.

Broadsheet and former broadsheet newspapers

{| class="sortable wikitable"
! Title
! Days ofpublication
!Circulation
! Established
!Editor
! Owner
! Politicalorientation
!Political party supportin the 2019 general election
! Format

|-
| The Sunday Times || Sundays || 647,622|| 1821
|Emma Tucker|| rowspan="2" |News Corporation|| rowspan="2"|Centre-right || rowspan="4" ||| Broadsheet
|-
| The Times || Daily || 365,880
| 1785
|John Witherow
| Compact
|-
| The Daily Telegraph || Daily || 317,819 || 1855
|Chris Evans || rowspan="2" |Press Holdings (Barclay brothers)
|  rowspan="2" |Right-wing || rowspan="2" | Broadsheet
|-
| The Sunday Telegraph || Sundays || 248,288|| 1961
|Allister Heath
|-
|The Observer
| Sundays
|152,129
|1791
|Paul Webster
| Scott Trust Limited's Guardian Media Group || Centre-left
| None || rowspan="4" |Compact
|-
| i || Daily
|148,163
| 2010
|Oliver Duff|| Daily Mail and General Trust|| |Centrist|| None

|-
|The Guardian
| Daily 
|111,953
|1821
|Katharine Viner
| Scott Trust Limited's Guardian Media Group || Centre-left
|Labour Party
|-
|i Weekend
|Saturdays
| rowspan="2" | N/A 
|2017 ||Oliver Duff|| Daily Mail and General Trust|| |Centrist || rowspan="3" | None
|-
|The Independent
|N/A
|1986
|Chris Broughton
|Sultan Muhammad AbuljadayelAlexander LebedevEvgeny Lebedev
|Centrist
|Online only
|-
| Financial Times || Daily 
|104,024
| 1888
|Roula Khalaf||Nikkei Inc.|| Centre to centre-right
| None | Broadsheet

|}

Tabloid newspapers

{| class="sortable wikitable"
! Title
!Days of publication
!Circulation
! Established
!Editor
! Owner
! Politicalorientation
! Political party supportin the 2019 general election
|-
| The Sun || Daily 
| 1,210,915 || 1964
| rowspan="2" |Victoria Newton|| rowspan="2" |News Corporation
| rowspan="6" |Right-wing
| rowspan="6"|Conservative Party
|-
| The Sun on Sunday || Sundays || 1,013,777 || 2012
|-
|Daily Mail
|Daily
|990,106
|1896
|Ted Verity
| rowspan="2" |Daily Mail and General Trust plc
|-
|The Mail on Sunday
|Sundays
|870,745
|1982
|David Dillon
|-
|Daily Express
|Daily
|248,967
|1900
|Gary Jones
|rowspan="2"|Reach
|-
|Sunday Express
|Sundays
|222,804
|1918
|Michael Booker
|-
| Daily Mirror || Daily 
|378,653
| 1903
| rowspan="2" |Lloyd Embley|| rowspan="5" |Reach || rowspan="3" | Centre-left || rowspan="3" |Labour Party
|-
| Sunday Mirror || Sundays 
|315,475
| 1915
|-
| Sunday People || Sundays 
|126,793
| 1881
|Peter Willis
|-
| Daily Star  || Daily 
|232,013
| 1978 
|Jon Clark|| rowspan="2" | Largely non-political ||rowspan="2" |None
|-
| Daily Star Sunday || Sundays 
|145,320
| 2002 
|Denis Mann
|-
| Morning Star || Daily 
|N/A|| 1930
|Ben Chacko||People's Press Printing Society||Left-wing||Labour Party
|-
|}

Freesheet newspapers in urban centres

{| class="sortable wikitable"
! Title
!Days of publication
!Circulation
!  style=" text-align:center;"| Format
!  style="text-align:center;"| Established
!Editor
! Owner
! Politicalorientation
! Distribution
! Political party supportin the 2019 general election
|-
| Evening Standard || Weekdays (evening) 
|488,698
| Tabloid || 1827 
|Emily Sheffield||Alexander LebedevLord Rothermere||Centre-right||Greater London
|
|-
| Metro || Weekdays 
|767,421
| Tabloid || 1999 
|Ted Young||Daily Mail and General Trust plc ||Largely non-political
| rowspan="2" | Wide availability in the major cities
| None
|-
| City A.M. || Weekdays (morning)
| rowspan="4" |N/A|| Tabloid || 2005 
|Andy Silvester|| City A.M. Ltd ||  Centre-right|| None
|-
| The Shuttle || Weekly|| Tabloid || 1870 
|Peter John|| Newsquest Media Group || rowspan="3" |N/A
|Wyre Forest area of Worcestershire
| None
|-
|Asian Express
|Weekly
|Tabloid
|1999
| rowspan="2" |N/A
|Media Buzz Ltd
|Wide availability in the major cities
| None
|-
| Yorkshire Reporter || Monthly|| Tabloid || 2013 || Pick up Publications Ltd || Widely available in Leeds and its surrounding areas
| None
|}

Street newspapers

{| class="sortable wikitable"
! Title
!Days of publication
!Circulation
!  style="text-align:center;"| Established
! Owner
! Distribution
|-
| The Big Issue || Weekly
|83,073
| September 1991
|The Big Issue
| UK-wide
|-
|}

Major news and political magazines

Newspapers in England

Regional newspapers in England

Local newspapers in England

Newspapers in Northern Ireland
{| class="sortable wikitable"
! Title !! Market type !! Print time !! Political alignment !! Format !! Circulation
|-
| The Belfast Telegraph || Regional || Morning || British Unionist - Liberal|| Compact || 35,931
|-
| The Irish News || Regional || Morning || Irish Nationalist|| Compact || 33,647
|-
| The News Letter || Regional || Morning ||  British Unionist - Conservative|| Tabloid || 13,374
|}

Local newspapers

Newspapers in Scotland

Daily newspapers
{| class="sortable wikitable"
! Title !! Market type !! Print time !! Location !! Format !! Scottish circulation
|-
| The Herald || National – Quality || Morning || Scottish || Broadsheet || 47,020
|-
| The Scotsman || National – Quality || Morning || Scottish || Compact || 38,423
|-
| The National || National – Mid Market || Morning || Scottish || Compact || 30,471
|-
| Daily Record || National – Tabloid || Morning || Scottish || Tabloid || 275,175
|-
| The Courier || Regional || Morning || Scottish || Compact || 61,981
|-
| The Press and Journal || Regional || Morning || Scottish || Compact || 71,044
|-
| Greenock Telegraph || Local || Morning || Scottish || Tabloid || 14,342
|-
| Paisley Daily Express || Local || Morning || Scottish || Tabloid || 7,538
|-
| Edinburgh Evening News || Local || Evening || Scottish || Tabloid || 39,947
|-
| Evening Express || Local || Evening || Scottish || Tabloid || 47,849
|-
| Evening Telegraph || Local || Evening || Scottish || Tabloid || 23,631
|-
| Evening Times || Local || Evening || Scottish || Tabloid || 52,400
|-
| The Daily Telegraph  (Scottish edition) || National – Quality || Morning || Scottish edition of UK Newspaper || Broadsheet || 22,172
|-
| The Times  (Scottish edition)|| National – Quality || Morning || Scottish edition of UK Newspaper || Compact || 19,994
|-
| Scottish Daily Express || National – Mid Market || Morning || Scottish edition of UK Newspaper || Tabloid || 65,689
|-
| Scottish Daily Mail || National – Mid Market || Morning || Scottish edition of UK Newspaper || Tabloid || 109,643
|-
| Daily Star of Scotland || National – Tabloid || Morning || Scottish edition of UK Newspaper || Tabloid || 65,084
|-
| Scottish Daily Mirror || National – Tabloid || Morning || Scottish edition of UK Newspaper || Tabloid || 24,333
|-
| The Scottish Sun || National – Tabloid || Morning || Scottish edition of UK Newspaper || Tabloid || 314,595
|-
| The Financial Times || National – Quality || Morning || UK Newspaper widely available in Scotland || Broadsheet || 3,528
|-
| The Guardian || National – Quality || Morning || UK Newspaper widely available in Scotland || Berliner || 14,069
|-
| i || National – Quality || Morning || UK Newspaper widely available in Scotland || Compact || 12,411
|-
| Metro, Scottish Edition || Urban – Free || Morning || Scottish edition of UK Newspaper || Tabloid || 125,002
|}

Sunday newspapers
{| class="sortable wikitable"
! Title !! Market type !! Location !! Format !! Scottish circulation
|-
| Scotland on Sunday || National – Quality || Scottish || Broadsheet || 50,897
|-
| Sunday Mail || National – Tabloid || Scottish || Tabloid || 354,396
|-
| The Sunday Post || National – Tabloid || Scottish || Tabloid || 224,471
|-
| The Sunday Times Scotland || National – Quality || Scottish edition of UK Newspaper || Broadsheet || 59,502
|-
| The Sunday Telegraph Scotland || National – Quality || Scottish edition of UK Newspaper || Broadsheet || 18,339
|-
| Mail on Sunday Scotland || National – Mid Market || Scottish edition of UK Newspaper || Tabloid || 105,223
|-
| Scottish Sunday Express || National – Mid Market || Scottish edition of UK Newspaper || Tabloid || 35,337
|-
| Scottish Sunday Mirror || National – Tabloid || Scottish edition of UK Newspaper || Tabloid || 21,809
|-
| The Observer || National – Quality || UK Newspaper widely available in Scotland || Berliner || 17,880
|-
| The Independent on Sunday || National – Quality || UK Newspaper widely available in Scotland || Compact || 6,317
|-
| Daily Star Sunday || National – Tabloid || UK Newspaper widely available in Scotland || Tabloid || 26,889
|-
| The Sunday Sport || National – Tabloid || UK Newspaper widely available in Scotland || Tabloid || n/a
|}

Newspapers in Wales

National newspapers
The Western Mail – owned by Reach plc
Y Cymro (weekly, Welsh language)
Wales on Sunday - sister publication of The Western Mail

Regional daily newspapers

North Wales Daily Post
South Wales Argus (Gwent area)
South Wales Echo (Cardiff area)
South Wales Evening Post (Swansea Bay area)
The Leader (Wrexham & Flintshire)

Regional newspapers

Abergavenny Chronicle
Abergele Visitor
Bangor and Anglesey Mail
Brecon and Radnor Express
Business Lancashire
Business Manchester
Business Merseyside
Business Cheshire
Caernarfon Herald
Caerphilly Observer
Cambrian News
Carmarthen Journal
Celtic Weekly Newspapers
Denbighshire Visitor
Flintshire Chronicle
Holyhead and Anglesey Mail
Llanelli Star
North Wales Weekly News
The Pembrokeshire Herald
The Powys County Times
Pembrokeshire (North) County Echo
Rhyl Visitor
Tenby Observer
The Western Telegraph
Wrexham Chronicle

Papurau Bro
Papurau Bro ('Area Papers') are Welsh language newspapers produced nominally monthly (typically 10 issues a year with a summer break) which cover the news in a small area - a town, group of parishes, one or a few valleys, etc. - with a circulation of perhaps a few thousand each. There are between 50 and 60 Papurau Bro which cover the whole of Wales, plus the Welsh communities of Liverpool and London. Papers are frequently named after local features, connections, crafts, etc., or in dialect (all imply 'gossip'). The first papur bro (Y Dinesydd) appeared in 1973 in Cardiff, and the following decade saw the establishment of most of the others. Much of the work of producing the papers is done voluntarily (aside from the printing), although financial support is given by Bwrdd yr Iaith (Welsh Language Board). Some of the papers listed may have ceased publication.

Non-English-language newspapers

Several newspapers in languages other than English are published in Britain, for immigrant and expatriate readers. Newspapers, both national and local, in Arabic, Bulgarian, Bangla, Italian, Korean, Latvian, Polish, Portuguese, Urdu, and other languages are published.

{| class="sortable wikitable"
! Title !! Published !! Language !! Audience
|-
| BG Ben ||Fortnightly || Bulgarian || Bulgarian newspaper for people living in UK
|-
| Hanin Herald || Weekly || Korean || Newspaper for the Korean community in the UK and abroad
|-
|  Tydzień Polski || Weekly || Polish || Newspaper aimed at Britain's Polish community
|-
| Cooltura || Weekly || Polish || Most popular magazine for the Polish community in the UK
|-
| Goniec Polski Polish Weekly Magazine || Weekly || Polish || Magazine for the Polish community in the UK
|-
| Polish Express || Weekly || Polish || Tabloid magazine for the Polish Community in the UK
|-
| Nowy Czas || Fortnightly || Polish || Magazine for educated Polish people living in UK
|-
| Sing Tao || Daily || Chinese || Newspaper aimed at Britain's and Europe's Chinese community
|-
| Achievements ||  || Russian || UK's national Russian newspaper
|-
| Nuacht24 || Daily || Irish || For the Irish speaking community of Northern Ireland and Irish immigrants
|-
| Qanun || Monthly || Persian || For Iranians
|-
| Y Cymro || Weekly || Welsh || For the Welsh-speaking areas of Wales and Welsh immigrants
|-
|Garavi Gujarat
|Weekly
|Gujarati
|Newspaper for the Gujarati community in the UK established in 1968
|}

Specialist newspapers

For specific ethnic groups
Desi Xpress – The UK's only national Asian entertainment weekly tabloid newspaper
Lanka Tribune – fortnightly newspaper for British Sri Lankans
Nigerian Watch – fortnightly newspaper aimed at the Nigerian community in the UK
The Irish World – aimed at Britain's Irish community
The Voice – a weekly tabloid newspaper aimed at the British Afro-Caribbean community
Eastern Eye – weekly newspaper for British Asians

For specific religions
The Baptist Times – Baptist/general Protestant newspaper
The Catholic Herald – Catholic newspaper
Christian Today – trans-denominational Christian newspaper
Church of England Newspaper – weekly Anglican paper
Church Times – weekly Anglican paper
English Churchman – fortnightly newspaper aimed at Protestants
Hamazor – published by the London-based World Zoroastrian Organisation
 The Friend – weekly independent Quaker newsmagazine
Jewish Chronicle – oldest continuously published Jewish newspaper in the world
Jewish Telegraph – editions published for Manchester, Leeds, Liverpool and Scotland, Britain's only region Jewish newspaper and has the longest serving editor of any newspaper in the country at its helm in Paul Harris.
Jewish Tribune – Haredi Jewish; has section in Yiddish language
Leeds Catholic Post – monthly Catholic paper for Leeds Diocese
The Messenger – fortnightly Seventh-day Adventist news magazine
The Muslim News – Islamic newspaper
The Tablet – Catholic newspaper
The Universe – Catholic newspaper
Several Muslim newspapers

Politics
Fight Racism! Fight Imperialism! – bi-monthly newspaper of the Revolutionary Communist Group
Irish Democrat – an Irish Republican weekly
The New European – weekly pro-EU newspaper owned by Archant
The News Line – daily newspaper of the Workers Revolutionary Party
Scottish Socialist Voice – fortnightly newspaper of the Scottish Socialist Party
The Socialist – weekly newspaper of the Socialist Party in England and Wales
Socialist Appeal – fortnightly newspaper of the British section of the International Marxist Tendency
Socialist Worker – weekly newspaper from the Socialist Workers Party
Solidarity – weekly newspaper of the Alliance for Workers' Liberty

Sport
The Cricket Paper – Friday paper summarising the week's cricketing news and action
The Football Paper 
League Express – Monday paper covering all Rugby League news, results and fixtures
The Non-League Paper – Sunday paper summarising the weekend's non-league football action and the week's non-league football news
Racing +
Racing Post – daily horse racing, greyhound racing and sports betting newspaper
The Rugby Paper – Sunday paper summarising the weekend's rugby union action and the week's rugby union news
The Sports Journal – Friday paper looking back at the weeks sporting news
Wisden – Weekly paper covering cricket news, articles, results and fixtures & other cricket related stories

Miscellaneous special interest
Black Country Bugle – weekly look at the history of the Black Country, published in newspaper format
Bulletin – online only UK newspaper
The Day – online daily newspaper for schools 
The Economist – weekly news-focused magazine
Estates Gazette – weekly newspaper aimed at property professionals
Farmers Guardian – weekly newspaper aimed at the farming industry
First News – weekly newspaper for children
Lloyd's List – daily international maritime, shipping and transport newspaper
London Gazette – official notices have to be published here; it is the oldest surviving English newspaper
London Review of Books – fortnightly literary newspaper
Mature Times – UK's only campaigning newspaper for the over-50s
PinkNews – UK-based online newspaper marketed to the lesbian, gay, bisexual and transgender (LGBT) community
Private Eye – fortnightly satirical magazine
The Stage – weekly newspaper covering entertainment issues, focused primarily on the theatre
Times Educational Supplement – weekly newspaper for the teaching profession
Times Higher Education – weekly newspaper for university / higher education profession
Times Literary Supplement – weekly literary and cultural journal
Classic Car Weekly – weekly newspaper for the classic car enthusiast

Restricted circulation newspapers

Corporate newspapers
Ariel – BBC
The Gazette – John Lewis Partnership

Student newspapers
Student newspapers include:

National
Student Times – free national student newspaper
The Tab – national tabloid-style student news website

Regional

Defunct newspapers

Notes

References

Further reading
 Viscount Camrose. Brutish Newspapers and their Controllers (1947) online, ownership of all major papers in 1947